The University of Florida Digital Collections (UFDC) are supported by the University of Florida Digital Library Center in the George A. Smathers Libraries at the University of Florida. The University of Florida Digital Collections (UFDC) comprise a constantly growing collection of digital resources from the University of Florida's library collections as well as partner institutions. Founded in April 2006, UFDC has added over 622,114 items - books, newspapers, oral histories, videos, photos, data sets, and more - with over 14 million pages.

Preservation and Access

The majority of materials are freely and openly accessible (Open Access) and provide full text searchability. In UFDC, all items can be text searched simultaneously or certain collections can be selected for a faceted search. Because UFDC grew out of the efforts of the University of Florida Libraries' Preservation Department, all items are scanned at preservation quality and all are digitally preserved with redundant backups. The page images are particularly important for the preservation of artifactually significant materials such as maps, artifacts, illustrated children's literature from the Baldwin Library of Historical Children's Literature, and other materials.

Technologies, Statistics, and Findability
The UF Digital Collections are powered by the open source SobekCM software engine and suite of associated tools. The associated tools include online user tools and standalone software for use in digitizing and curating born digital materials. The online system is deployed with Solr and other technologies for optimal functionality.

Because of the highly visual nature of so many items, the pages are displayed as zoomable images (through a JPG2000 server) and all can be browsed as thumbnails at the item and the collection level. Artifacts with multiple photos from multiple angles can be seen in motion, rotating in an Adobe Flash video view, and items can be searched by their geographic information (city, county, state, latitude and longitude) or viewed on a map through UFDC's use of the Google Maps API.

UFDC includes books, articles, newspapers, photos, videos, audio, and more. As of June 2019, the collections had grown to over 14 million pages. UFDC's statistics page maintains a running tally of loaded items broken down by collection: http://ufdc.ufl.edu/stats/.

Along with loading new items regularly, UFDC is optimized for search engine findability on an ongoing basis.

References

External links
 University of Florida Digital Collections (UFDC)
 SobekCM, the technology of the University of Florida Digital Collections and the Digital Library of the Caribbean
 University of Florida Digital Library Center
 George A. Smathers Libraries
 Link to all of UF's libraries

Selected List of Collections

See all collections in UFDC
University of Florida Baldwin Library and the Baldwin Library of Historical Children's Literature Digital Collection
Florida Digital Newspaper Library and Florida Digital Newspaper Library
Digital Library of the Caribbean and Digital Library of the Caribbean, a collaborative digital library where UF is the technical host partner 
Florida and Puerto Rico Digital Newspaper Project (UFNDNP)
Florida Aerials
Pioneer Days in Florida
University of Florida Panama and the Canal Collection and the Panama and the Canal Digital Collection
Jean-Marie Derscheid for the Jean-Marie Derscheid Digital Collection
African American Collections
Africana Digital Collections
Florida Architecture & Landscape Design Digital Collection
Asian Digital Collections
Comics Digital Collection
Parkman Dexter Howe Library Digital Collection
Education Module Digital Collection
Florida Cities Digital Collection
Oral History Digital Collections from the Samuel Proctor Oral History Program and Matheson Museum
Florida History and Heritage Digital Collections
Historic Newspaper Catalog Record Collection
Florida Law Digital Collection
Florida Photographs Digital Collections
Oral Histories Digital Collection
Food and Agricultural Sciences Digital Collection
International Farming Systems Collection
European Digital Collections
Graphic Art Digital Collection
Jaqi Languages Digital Collection
Judaica Digital Collections
Natural Sciences Digital Collection
Open Stacks Project
Performing Arts Digital Collection
Psychological Study of the Arts Digital Collection
Radical Women in Gainesville Digital Collection
Rossica Digital Collection
Sanborn Maps Digital Collection
Sciences and Technologies Digital Collection
South American Digital Collections
Spanish Borderlands Digital Collections
Southwest Florida Library Network (SWFLN) Digital Collections
The Floridians Digital Collection
Theology Digital Collection
Health Science Archives Photographs Collection
Herbarium Specimens Digital Collection
University of Florida Institutional Repository
Wetlands Digital Collection
Women in Development Digital Collection
World Maps Digital Collection
Unearthing St. Augustine's Colonial Heritage

See also
 
 

2006 establishments in Florida
American digital libraries
Caribbean studies
Libraries in Florida
Mass digitization
Florida
University of Florida